The Horace M. Tallman House is a historic house located at 816 W. Main St. in Shelbyville, Illinois. Horace M. Tallman built the Queen Anne house for his family in 1905. Tallman was a farmer and farm implement salesman, and he became the owner of the Ann Arbor Machine Company in 1920. In 1928–29, Tallman invented the pickup hay baler, which automated the process of baling and collecting hay. While Tallman died in 1929, his sons developed and marketed the baler, which became a labor-saving machine which permanently changed farming practices. Tallman's house is the only surviving building connected to Tallman and the invention of the pickup hay baler.

The house was added to the National Register of Historic Places on May 6, 1988.

References

Houses on the National Register of Historic Places in Illinois
Queen Anne architecture in Illinois
Houses in Shelby County, Illinois
Houses completed in 1905
National Register of Historic Places in Shelby County, Illinois
1905 establishments in Illinois